Felix Luckeneder (born 21 March 1994) is an Austrian footballer who plays for LASK.

Club career
On 31 August 2021, he returned to LASK on a three-year contract.

References

External links
 
 

Austrian footballers
Association football defenders
LASK players
FC Juniors OÖ players
SC Rheindorf Altach players
TSV Hartberg players
Austrian Football Bundesliga players
2. Liga (Austria) players
Austrian Regionalliga players
1994 births
Living people
Footballers from Linz